Yamal LNG is a joint venture based around a liquefied natural gas plant located in Sabetta at the north-east of the Yamal Peninsula, northwest Siberia, Russia. In addition to the LNG plant, the project includes production at the Yuzhno-Tambeyskoye gas field, and the transport infrastructure, including the Sabetta seaport and airport.

History

Yamal LNG project was proposed when the company with the same name and controlled by Gennady Timchenko and Pyotr Kolbin got a license for the Yuzhno-Tambeyskoye gas field in 2005. Novatek took control of Yamal LNG in 2009. Another project named Yamal LNG was proposed by Gazprom. In November 2008, Gazprom announced that it prepared a list of potential partners for the LNG plant of the Yamal project. Although the list was not disclosed, Gazprom indicated that ExxonMobil and ConocoPhillips were included on the list.  Also Royal Dutch Shell, Repsol YPF and Petro-Canada were mentioned as potential partners. In October 2010, the Novatek's project was chosen by the Russian government as a pilot project.  The groundbreaking ceremony for the port construction was held in July 2012; however, construction of the port itself began in 2013.

As of 7 April 2014, the Yamal LNG OJSC is Novatek (60% stake), China's CNPC (20% stake) and France's Total (20% stake).

In December 2014, amid the 2014–15 Russian financial crisis, the Russian government gave a 150 billion rouble subsidy to the project.

The commercial operation of the port and first  LNG train (LNG purification facility) were launched on 8 December 2017 by starting loading the first LNG carrier named after the late CEO of Total Christophe de Margerie. The loading was ceremonially launched by president Vladimir Putin in the presence of Saudi Arabia's energy minister Khalid al-Falih.

According to Novatek on 22 October 2019, the natural gas reserves in the Yamalo-Nenets Autonomous Okrug represent 80% of Russia's natural gas and 15% of the world's natural gas supply.

In 2021, Yamal LNG was ranked no. 30 among 120 oil, gas, and mining companies involved in resource extraction north of the Arctic Circle in the Arctic Environmental Responsibility Index (AERI). The plant is expected to produce a total of 926 billion cubic metres of liquefied natural gas from the South Tambey field and is considered by some to be the 'crown jewel' of the Northern Sea Route.

Technical description
The project cost is US$27 billion.

The Yamal LNG plant will have three trains with total capacity of 16.5 million tonnes of liquefied natural gas per year when fully operational.  The first train is operational at the end of 2017 and the full 3 train capacity is to be achieved by 2021. A second LNG Plant, named Artic LNG 2, is also proposed at a site to east near the Gyda Peninsula, across the river Ob estuary from Sabetta

The plant was designed and commissioned by consortium of Technip and JGC Corporation, and Chiyoda.  In addition to the LNG plant, the project includes the construction of a seaport, airport and power plant.  The power plant will be built by Technopromexport and its turbines will be supplied by Siemens. The power plant will have capacity of 380 MW(during ISO conditions) across its 8 turbines and it is to be operational by 2018.  Construction of the port facilities started in September 2013.

The LNG plant is supplied from the Yuzhno-Tambeyskoye gas field.  The main export market for LNG would be China.  LNG would be shipped to Asian markets through the Northeast Passage.  Daewoo Shipbuilding & Marine Engineering is contracted to build up to sixteen Arc7 double acting ice-class gas tankers for the project.  Tankers will be chartered and operated by Sovcomflot.

A 180 km railway line is being built, connecting Bovanenkovo to Sabetta.

Ownership
The project is developed by JSC Yamal LNG. Novatek owns 50.1% stake in the company while Total S.A. and CNPC own 20% each with China's Silk Road Fund has signed agreement to purchase 9.9% stake.  General director of the company was Gleb Luxemburg 
and from September 2014 Evgeny Kot has been appointed the CEO of Yamal LNG.

Icebreaker LNG carriers
Yamal LNG has commissioned 15 LNG icebreaker/tanker ships to export its gas.  Each icebreaker/tanker is designed to operate year-round from the Yamal peninsula and to break ice up to 2.5 meters thick. The ships are leased by Yamal LNG from four companies: Sovcomflot, one ship; MOL, three ships; Dynagas, five ships; and Teekay, six ships. The tankers were designed in Finland by Aker Arctic Technology Inc. and built at the Daewoo Shipbuilding & Marine Engineering (DSME) shipyard in South Korea.

The first icebreaker, Christophe de Margerie, traversed from Norway to South Korea across the Northern Sea Route in 19 days in August 2017.

When ice precludes shipping along the Northern Sea Route, then the Fluxys terminal at Zeebrugge, Belgium, will serve Russia as the LNG port for the Asia-Pacific region.

Ships

In service as of October 2019:
Christophe de Margerie, Sovcomflot
Boris Vilkitsky, Dynagas
Fedor Litke, Dynagas
Eduard Toll, Teekay
Vladimir Rusanov, MOL
Vladimir Vize, COSCO Shipping and MOL
Rudolf Samoylovich, Teekay
Nikolay Yevgenov, Teekay
Georgiy Brusilov, Dynagas
Boris Davydov, Dynagas
Nikolay Zubov, Dynagas
Vladimir Voroni, Teekay
Nikolay Urvantsev, MOL
Georgiy Ushakov, Teekay
Yakov Gakkel, Teekay

United States sanctions beginning September 2019
Following the 14 September 2019 attack by Iran on Saudi Arabian oil fields at Khurais and Abqaiq (Biqayq in Arabic) during the 2019–2021 Persian Gulf crisis, the United States imposed sanctions under executive order 13846 against several companies including Cosco Shipping Tanker (Dalian) Seaman and Ship Management Company Ltd and the Cosco Shipping Tanker Dalian (大連中遠海運油品運輸有限公司) which are two Cosco Shipping Company subsidiaries that are supporting LNG shipments from Sabetta. As of late September 2019, the Joint Venture TC LNG between the Cosco Shipping Tanker Dalian company (50% stake) and the Canadian firm Teekay is the China LNG Shipping Ltd (CLNG) which has more than one third of Sabetta's LNG ice fleet, six ARC7 LNG tankers: Eduard Toll, Rudolf Samoilovich, Nikolay Evgenov, Vladimir Voronin all of which are operating, Georgy Ushakov which is going to Sabetta after sea trials, and Yakov Gakkel which is under sea trials at a South Korean shipyard. Also affected are five ARC7 tankers which Dynagas will supply in a partnership between Sinotrans&CSC and CLNG (25.5% stake), as well as three ARC7 tankers from a joint venture between the Cosco subsidiary Shanghai LNG and Japan's MOL (株式会社商船三井). However, these former five and later three ARC7 tankers are not directly sanctioned but US Office of Foreign Assets Control (OFAC) rules require caution to be exercised in the former. Of the fifteen ARC7 tankers operating out of Sabetta, only Sovcomflot's Christophe de Margerie is not affected by the sanctions. Although these ships have been serviced at Honningsvåg, Norway, this will be phased out and future LNG tanker shipments along the Northern Sea Route may occur between Murmansk and Kamchatka in Russia coastal waters. On 30 January 2020, the United States lifted sanctions on Cosco Shipping Tanker (Dalian) and its TC LNG.

References

External links
 
 https://www.tv4play.se/program/nyheterna/11985830
 

Companies based in Yamalo-Nenets Autonomous Okrug
Energy in Siberia
Energy infrastructure in Russia
Industry in the Arctic
JGC Corporation
Liquefied natural gas plants
Natural gas companies of Russia